Last of the Good Guys is the debut album of the American country music group One Flew South. It was released on Decca Records Nashville on May 27, 2008. The album's debut single, "My Kind of Beautiful" (co-written and previously recorded by Andy Griggs on his 2005 album This I Gotta See), was released to radio in June 2008, and charted on the Billboard Hot Country Songs charts. The album peaked at #67 on the Top Country Albums charts.

Track listing
"Last of the Good Guys" (Marcus Hummon) – 4:30
"My Kind of Beautiful" (Hummon, Andy Griggs, Darrell Scott) – 4:00
"Junkie" (Hummon) – 4:44
"Life" (Billy Mann, Chris Roberts) – 4:14
"She's a Gift" (Eddie Bush, J.D. Souther) – 3:52
"Sara" (Hummon, Bush, Royal Reed, Chris Roberts) – 3:20
"It Is Good" (Hummon, Souther) – 3:30
"Shameless" (Bush, Reed, Roberts, Hummon, Jez Ashurst) – 3:47
"Let the Day Carry You" (Bush, Souther) – 3:27
"Makin' It Rain" (Hummon, Bush, Reed, Roberts) – 3:37
"Blue Highways" (Reed, Roberts, Bill Deasy) – 4:02
"Too Old to Die Young" (Kevin Welch, John Hadley, Scott Dooley) – 2:17

Personnel

One Flew South
Eddie Bush – vocals, acoustic guitar, electric guitar, gut string guitar
Royal Reed – vocals
Chris Roberts – vocals

Additional musicians
Chad Cromwell – drums
Dan Dugmore – pedal steel guitar
John Gardner – drums, djembe
Marcus Hummon – acoustic guitar, 12-string guitar, mandolin, piano
George Marinelli – 12 string guitar, electric guitar
Dave Matthews – keyboards, percussion
Mark Prentice – bass guitar
Darrell Scott – mandolin
Michael Severs – electric guitar
Wanda Vick – mandolin, banjo, Dobro
Jonathan Yudkin – fiddle

Chart performance

References

2008 debut albums
Decca Records albums
One Flew South albums